Marmaduke Smith was an American tennis player active in the late 19th century.

Tennis career
Smith reached the semifinals of the U.S. National Championships in 1891 (beating Joseph Clark before losing to Fred Hovey).

References

1868 births
1935 deaths
American male tennis players
Tennis people from Pennsylvania